is a railway station of the Chūō Main Line, East Japan Railway Company (JR East) in Wakamiya 1-chōme, in the city of Nirasaki, Yamanashi Prefecture, Japan.

Lines
Nirasaki Station is served by the Chūō Main Line, and is 147.0 kilometers from the terminus of the line at Tokyo Station.

Station layout
The station consists of a single island platform connected to the two-story station building by a footbridge. The station has a Midori no Madoguchi staffed ticket office.

Platforms

History
Nirasaki Station was opened on 15 December 1903 on the Japanese Government Railways (JGR) Chūō Main Line when the line was extended from Kōfu. The track was further extended from this station to Fujimi on 21 December 1904. The JGR became the JNR (Japanese National Railways) after the end of World War II.  With the dissolution and privatization of the JNR on 1 April 1987, the station came under the control of the East Japan Railway Company. Automated turnstiles using the Suica IC Card system came into operation from October 16, 2004.

Passenger statistics
In fiscal 2010, the station was used by an average of 2,682 passengers daily (boarding passengers only).
ef>

Surrounding area
Nirasaka City Hall
Nirasaka Elementary School
Nirasaka High School

See also
 List of railway stations in Japan

References

 Miyoshi Kozo. Chuo-sen Machi to eki Hyaku-niju nen. JT Publishing (2009)

External links

JR East Nirasaki Station

Railway stations in Yamanashi Prefecture
Railway stations in Japan opened in 1903
Chūō Main Line
Stations of East Japan Railway Company
Nirasaki, Yamanashi